Alberto Herrera Rodríguez (born 23 February 2001) is a Mexican professional footballer who plays as a defensive midfielder for Liga MX club Puebla.

Career statistics

Club

References

External links
 
 
 

Living people
2001 births
Association football midfielders
Club Puebla players
Liga MX players
Footballers from Tamaulipas
People from Ciudad Madero
Mexican footballers